Shiba Maggon (Hindi:'शीबा मग्गोन') (born 16 March 1976 ) is an Indian basketball player who played for the India national team. She is currently the coach for the Indian Senior women Team, as well as an international referee. She was one of the first women to qualify as a referee.

Early life
Shiba started playing basketball since 1989.  She played for Sports Authority of India (SAI). In 1992, she was selected for the Indian Junior team. Shiba had her initial schooling days in Karnal and later joined SAI at Chandigarh and stayed there till 1996. She later joined Western Railways, Ajmer in 1996 and was with them till 2002. In 2002 Shiba joined MTNL Delhi and played with them till Jan 2011. She has agreed to be basketball mentor for Indian Collegiate Athletic Program. She is Technical Director for Kooh Sports, and Director for Poshac a Pan India program.

National achievements
Maggon has a list of basketball achievements leading back to her Youth days. She has won the following medals in her career:
 One Gold medal in 1991 in Youth category
 One Gold medal in 1993 and a Silver medal in 1994 Youth Nationals and bronze in 1991.

Shiba Maggon went on to play a total of 20 Senior Nationals starting from 1989 till 2010.
Listed below are some of her achievements in the Senior category: 
 Six Gold medals at Sr National Championship playing for Indian Railways, Year 1997 to 2002
 One Gold Medal and Eight Silver Medals at Sr National Championship playing for Delhi, Year 2003 to 2011.
 Six federation cups Three Gold and Three Bronze medals.
 Two Gold Medals and One Bronze Medal at All India University level.
 Shiba was also awarded Best player several times and made Hattrick at PNC All India championship to sweep away the Best player Award.
 She was a consistent player and a consistent scorer for the past 20 years, scoring an average of 20 points for the last championship.
 She has also played in 3 National games. She won a bronze medal in 1994 National games at Pune and another bronze at 2007 National games in Guwahati.

International career and achievements
Maggon has played in five FIBA Asian Championships for Women and was ranked in the top 5 for Asian players in 2002. She was also part of Indian Team to take part at Commonwealth Games at Australia in 2006. She got a scholarship to the Southwestern Oklahoma State University in 1998. She majored in Physical Education. Maggon applied for a Diploma Course in Olympism and Humanism with the International Olympic Academy and successfully finished the Diploma at the historic city, Athens. Maggon was chosen to represent the whole world and give a vote of thanks speech on behalf of the 98 countries who were taking part in that sessions.

Maggon is credited as being the first Indian woman to be an international FIBA certified referee, along with Maharashtrian Snehal Bendke. She is also an international coach, part-time voice over commentator and has worked in the past with NBA in India.

References

External links
 
 Shiba Maggon Archives

1976 births
Living people
People from Karnal
Indian women's basketball coaches
Indian women's basketball players
Basketball players from Haryana
Sportswomen from Haryana